Queen Munjeong of the Gaeseong Wang clan (Hangul: 문정왕후 왕씨, Hanja: 文貞王后 王氏; d. 23 July 1138) was a Goryeo royal family member as the granddaughter of King Munjong who became the third wife of her first cousin, King Yejong. Since she was closely related to her husband, this marriage was somewhat controversial. The marriage produced no children.

Biography

Early life
The future Queen Munjeong was born as the daughter of Wang-Yu, Marquess Jinhan (왕유 진한후) and the granddaughter of Munjong of Goryeo and Worthy Consort Ingyeong. King Munjong was also her future husband, King Yejong's grandfather. Yejong's grandmother was Queen Inye who was Consort Ingyeong's sister and was born as the same daughter of Yi Ja-yeon (이자연) from the Incheon Yi clan. So, Yejong initially Wang's half first cousin.

Palace life and later life
In 1211, King Yejong choose her as one of his consort and she then entered the palace not long after that. A year later, he passed away and she then stayed at Yeongjeong Palace (영정궁). In 1129, she was given a Royal title of Noble Consort (귀비, 貴妃) under Yejong's son, King Injong's command. Meanwhile, she later died in 1138 and received her Posthumous name. During her mourn, Injong and his officials stopped the inquiry for three days and put on a small suit.

References

External links
문정왕후 on Doosan Encyclopedia .

12th-century births
1138 deaths
Royal consorts of the Goryeo Dynasty
12th-century Korean women